The 13th Golden Horse Awards (Mandarin:第13屆金馬獎) took place on October 30, 1976 at Zhongshan Hall in Taipei, Taiwan.

Winners and nominees 
Winners are listed first, highlighted in boldface.

References

13th
1976 film awards
1976 in Taiwan